Bernard Hugo (4 October 1930 – 19 March 2021) was a French politician. A member of the French Communist Party, he served as a Senator from Yvelines, Mayor of Trappes, and General Councillor of the Canton of Trappes.

References

1930 births
2021 deaths
20th-century French politicians
French Communist Party politicians
French Senators of the Fifth Republic
Mayors of places in Île-de-France
People from Essonne